Gippsland Independent Schools (GIS) is an association of schools in Gippsland, Victoria, Australia. The association organises many inter-school extracurricular competitions. These include swimming, diving, athletics, summer sports (cricket, tennis, softball and basketball), winter sports (football, soccer, hockey and netball), and cultural festivals, including drama, chess, dance and debating.
Students from year 7 and up can participate in most of these events.

Schools 

Chairo Christian School, Drouin
Chairo Christian School, Leongatha
Chairo Christian School, Traralgon
Mary MacKillop Catholic Regional College, Leongatha
Lavalla Catholic College, Traralgon

 
Australian schools associations